Odhran Ua hEolais (died A.D. 994) was a medieval scribe and scholar at the abbey of Clonmacnoise.  He must have been born, and lived his childhood, in the kingdom of Conmaicne Magh Réin, which corresponds to present day south county Leitrim. We do not know any significant details of his personal life, but Odhran moved to county Offaly in adult life, to become Lector and a famous scriba of Clonmacnoise. His death is recorded in the Annals of the Four Masters. A cross-stone of Odhran, with his name inscription legible in middle Irish, is preserved to this day.

Etymology
The given name , pronounced "Orin", is a diminutive of "Odar" meaning 'gray' or "pale", and was anglicised "Horan".  The family name  has the meaning "descendant of Eolais". O'Donovan claimed the "Eóluis" surname is today anglicised "Olus" or "Olis", though this surname must be very rare.

Life
Odhran was born into the Túath called Conmaicne Réin, present day south county Leitrim, sometime in the first half of the 10th century. His family a Gaelic dynasty who ruled it. Odhran was probably grandson of Eolais Mac Biobhsach ("descendant of Eolais"), a king of "". He received some sort of formal education probably at a monastery in county Leitrim. He became proficient and literate in Irish language, Latin, bardic tradition, and religious doctrine.

Sometime in his adult life he moved to Clonmacnoise, the celebrated early Irish Christian monastery, taking the position of ecclesiastical Lector and "scribe of Clonmacnoise". Odhran belonged to the scholarly hierarchy of the church, otherwise called "", implying he was not in orders but rather trained in Christian learning. Odhran probably shared duties for scribing manuscripts, and his contributions if preserved over the centuries, would exist in the Irish Annals.

Odhran may have moved to Clonmacnoise to help secure burial rights in Clonmacnoise for Mag Raghnaill of Conmaicne Réin. There was an alleged controversy between Fearghal Ua Ruairc, King of Connaught (died A.D. 964 ), and Brian mag Raghnaill, a successor of Eolais mac Biobhsach. Mag Raghnaill complained he had no place for a tomb at Clonmacnoise, unlike Fearghal Ua Ruairc, and so bestowed "48 ploughs" of Kiltoghert land to the bishop of Clonmacnoise in exchange for a burial right. It is tempting to suppose the appearance of Odhran Ua hEolais, an outsider, at Clonmacnoise is related to such matters if true, but O'Donovan raises doubts about this O'Rourke connection.

Death
The death of Odhran, is recorded in the Annals of the Four Masters as follows:

 "994: and Odhran Ua h-Eolais, scribe of Cluain-mic-Nois, died", "".

Cross-slab

His cross-slab has been preserved, and four different sources interpreted the inscription as follows:

 OR DOODRAN HAU EOLAIS.
 ÓŔ DÓ ODRÁN HÁU EOLÁIS.
 O~R~ || D~O~ODRÁN | HÁU || EOLAIS, expanded as OROIT DO ODRÁN HÁU EOLAIS.
 O~R~ || DOODRÁN | HÁU || EOLAIS, expanded as OROIT DO ODRÁN HÁU EOLAIS, and translated to "Pray for Odrán, descendant of Eolais".
 ÕÕ DO ODRAN HAUEOLAIS.

Instead of the more usual key-pattern, interlace and channels were used to ornament the central and boundary areas of the distorted cross motif on Ordan's stone, a decorative practice which dropped out of use on Clonmacnoise cross-slabs, . MacAlister states the cross on the "Ódhrán stone" is a poor piece of work, and may be regarded as an imitation of the design on the handsome stone of "Mael-Finnia", the Abbot of Clonmacnoise who died A.D. 991, as both stones share similar ornamental features.  Graves thought it was a "fine specimen, both as to cross and inscription".

These may be "grave stones", but the awkward way in which the inscription was fitted onto the stone introduces the notion these slabs were kept in stock in the monastery workshop with pre-inscribed crosses, until a client name needed to be fitted in. This implies Ódhrán might have commissioned the stone to request prayers for himself, and the slab was not his grave memorial.

See also

 Flannchad Ua hEolais
 Eolais Mac Biobhsach

Notes and references

Notes

Citations

Primary sources

Secondary sources

Bibliography

External links
 O'Rourkes Tower at Clonmacnoise, http://www.megalithicireland.com/O'Rourke's%20Tower,%20Clonmacnoise.html

History of County Leitrim
10th-century Irish priests
10th-century births
10th-century deaths
People from County Leitrim
People from County Offaly
Irish Christian monks
People of Conmaicne Maigh Nissi